Brian Kennedy Seals (born August 8, 1983) is an American songwriter, record producer, composer and musician from Kansas City, Missouri. In 2006 he was credited with production on Ciara's album Ciara: The Evolution. Some well known artists he has worked with include  Rihanna, Kelly Clarkson, Chris Brown, Rascal Flatts, Jennifer Hudson, Lady Gaga, CeeLo Green, Backstreet Boys, Jamie Foxx, Nelly, and Natasha Bedingfield. Kennedy has also collaborated with major songwriters including David Foster, James Fauntleroy and Diane Warren.

Kennedy is best known for his work on "Disturbia", recorded by Rihanna for her "Good Girl Gone Bad: Reloaded" album and "Forever", the second song released by Chris Brown from his "Exclusive: The Forever Edition" album. He earned a Grammy Award in 2009 for his contribution to Jennifer Hudson's self-titled debut album, which took home honors as Best R&B Album. The song "If This Isn't Love" garnered an ASCAP win for him as well.

He is a graduate of Paseo Academy of Performing Arts and an alumnus of the Kansas City Boys Choir in Kansas City. He now resides in Southern California.

Early life
Brian Kennedy was born in Kansas City, Missouri, United States. He is the fourth of five children to Charles and Beverly Seals (née Davis). At an early age, he developed an appreciation for the piano. He began taking formal classical piano lessons at age six.

Kennedy attended the Paseo Academy school of performing arts with a major in music from 1998–2002.

Production and songwriter credits

2006
 Ciara – Ciara: The Evolution
 08. "My Love" (co-produced by Ciara Harris, Antwoine Collins)

 Mario Vazquez – Mario Vazquez
 11. "How We Do It" (co-produced by The Underdogs & Antwoine "T-Wiz" Collins)

2008
 Brandy – Human
 15. "Fall"
 17. "Locket (Locked in Love)" [bonus track]

 Chris Brown – Exclusive: The Forever Edition
 17. "Forever" (co-produced with Polow da Don)

 Noel Gourdin – After My Time
 08. "I Fell"

 Jennifer Hudson – Jennifer Hudson
 02. "If This Isn't Love"
 06. "My Heart" (co-produced with Polow da Don)
 07. "You Pulled Me Through" (co-produced with The Underdogs)

 Jesse McCartney – Departure
 02. "It's Over" (co-produced with The Clutch)
 10. "Runnin'" (co-produced with The Clutch)
 14. "Crash & Burn"

 New Kids on the Block – The Block
 11. "Lights, Camera, Action" (co-produced with Polow da Don)

 Rihanna – Good Girl Gone Bad: Reloaded
 13. "Disturbia"

2009
 Corbin Bleu – Speed of Light
 01. "Speed of Light"
 02. "Paralyzed"
 04. "Fear of Flying"
 06. "Rock 2 It"
 09. "My Everything"

 BoA – BoA
 06. "Obsessed"

BoA – BoA: DELUXE
 02. "Control"

 Backstreet Boys – This Is Us
 08. "Masquerade"

 Chris Brown – Graffiti
 09. "Pass Out" (featuring Eva Simons)
 13. "I'll Go"

 Lee Charm
 01. "D.E.T.O.X"

 Marié Digby – Breathing Underwater
 02. "Avalanche"
 03. "Breathing Underwater"
 04. "Should've Been Simple"
 07. "Come Find Me"
 09. "Machine"
 10. "Overboard"
 12. "Come to Life"

 Kid Sister – Ultraviolet
 07. "Daydreaming" (featuring Cee-Lo)

 Rihanna –  Rated R
 07. "Fire Bomb"
 13. "The Last Song"

 Westlife – Where We Are
 07. "The Difference"

 Alexandra Burke – Overcome
 12. "They Don't Know"

2010
 Jessica Mauboy – Get 'Em Girls
 5. "Saturday Night" (featuring Ludacris)
Charice – Charice
 4. "Nobody's Singin' to Me"

2011
 Chris Brown – F.A.M.E.
 12. "Should've Kissed You"

 Joe Jonas – Fastlife
 03. "See No More"

Pia Toscano
 "This Time"

Kelly Clarkson – Stronger
 "Mr. Know It All"

2012
Jeffree Star – Virginity
 03. "Best. Night. Ever."
Chris Brown – Fortune
 10. "Stuck on Stupid"
 12. "Party Hard / Cardillac (Interlude) (feat. Sevyn)"
 13. "Don't Wake Me Up"
Rihanna – Unapologetic
 12. "Get It Over With"

2014 
Teyana Taylor – VII

 11. "Business"

2015 
CeeLo Green – Heart Blanche
 13. "Smells Like Fire"

The Internet – Ego Death
 10. "Partners In Crime Part Three"

Britney Spears –  Glory
 "Dem Chicks Be Like" (Unreleased)

2016 
Rihanna – Anti
 13. "Close To You"

Fantasia – No Time For It

2017 
CID 
    "Believer" (featuring CeeLo Green)

2018 
Seeb - Nice To Meet You 
 3. "Nice To Meet You" (featuring Goodito Frito)

Daughtry - Cage to Rattle
 8. "Gravity"Exo - Don't Mess Up My Tempo' 9. "Smile On My Face"

 Grammy Awards 

|-
| 2008
| Jennifer Hudson - Jennifer Hudson| Best R&B Album
| 
|-
| 2009
| Rihanna - Disturbia| Best Dance Recording
| 
|-
| 2011
| Chris Brown - F.A.M.E| Best R&B Album
| 
|-
| 2012
| Rihanna - Unapologetic| Best Urban Contemporary Album
| 
|-
| 2012
| Kelly Clarkson - Stronger| Best Pop Vocal Album
| 
|}

 Ascap Awards 

|-
| 2009
| Rihanna - Disturbia| Among the most performed songs of 2008
| 
|-
| 2009
| Chris Brown - Forever| Among the most performed songs of 2008
| 
|-
| 2010
| Jennifer Hudson - If This Isn't Love| Among the songs that reached the top of the R&B and Hip Hop Charts in 2009
| 
|-
| 2013
| Chris Brown - Don't Wake Me Up| Among the most performed songs of 2012
| 
|-
| 2013
| Kelly Clarkson - Mr. Know It All''
| Among the most performed songs of 2012
| 
|}

References

1983 births
Living people
Record producers from Missouri
Songwriters from Missouri